McDew is a surname. Notable people with the surname include:

Charles McDew (1938–2018), American activist
Darren W. McDew (born 1960), United States Air Force general